Co., Ltd. was a Japanese publisher founded in 1971 and who filed for bankruptcy in 1999. It originally published learning reference books, but it is more known for its 1986 arcade game magazine . The representative was Hiroshi Kato. The company's capital was 10 million yen.

References 

Book publishing companies of Japan
Magazine publishing companies of Japan
Publishing companies established in 1971
Publishing companies disestablished in 1999
Magazine publishing companies in Tokyo
Mass media companies of Japan
Japanese companies disestablished in 1999
Japanese companies established in 1971